Burning Bodhi is a 2015 independent film written and directed by Matthew McDuffie. It stars Kaley Cuoco, Landon Liboiron, Sasha Pieterse, and Cody Horn. The film had its world premiere at the Austin Film Festival on November 1, 2015.

Plot
Dylan (Landon Liboiron) finds out via Facebook that his best friend from high school, "Bodhi" has died suddenly of an aneurysm. Reluctantly, he returns to his old neighborhood in New Mexico to grieve his popular friend's death. Yet, as past lovers and old friends follow suit, Dylan gradually realizes his homecoming also means reconciling the realities of his present with those of the people from his past. The former classmates struggle with the experience of confronting not only Bodhi's sudden passing, but their own vulnerability to blind chance. Throughout their reunion, sticky feelings of love, longing and regret are stirred up in the characters, alongside novel insights into forgiveness, mortality and gratitude.

Cast

Kaley Cuoco as Katy
Sasha Pieterse as Aria
Virginia Madsen as Naomi
Tatanka Means as Lucas
Cody Horn as Ember
Landon Liboiron as Dylan
Andy Buckley as Buck
Meghann Fahy as Lauren
Jason A. Sedillo as Big Bob's Friend
Eli Vargas as Miguel
Lauren Ham as Ember's Friend
Augusta Allen-Jones as Rock Chick
Christopher Atwood as Bodhi's Dad
Juanita Trad as Katy's Grandmother
Lara Dale as Katy's Mom
Wyatt Denny as Big Bob

Production
Principal photography commenced in Albuquerque, New Mexico in July 2014.

Release
The film had its world premiere at the Austin Film Festival on November 1, 2015. monterey media bought the U.S. and Canadian rights for the film in November following the Austin Film Festival. The theatrical launch was  March 18, 2016.

References

External links

2015 films
2015 independent films
American independent films
2010s English-language films
2010s American films